Erik Gliha (born 13 February 1997) is a Slovenian football player who plays as a defender.

Club career
Gliha made his Slovenian PrvaLiga debut for Krka on 7 August 2015 in a game against Zavrč.

Personal life
He is the son of former Slovenian national team member Primož Gliha.

References

External links
 

1997 births
Living people
People from Niort
Sportspeople from Deux-Sèvres
Footballers from Nouvelle-Aquitaine
Slovenian footballers
Association football fullbacks
Slovenia youth international footballers
Slovenia under-21 international footballers
NK Šampion players
NK Krka players
NK Ankaran players
U.S. Avellino 1912 players
NK Aluminij players
Sint-Truidense V.V. players
NK Triglav Kranj players
FC Rukh Lviv players
NK Olimpija Ljubljana (2005) players
Slovenian Second League players
Slovenian PrvaLiga players
Ukrainian Premier League players
Slovenian expatriate footballers
Expatriate footballers in Italy
Slovenian expatriate sportspeople in Italy
Expatriate footballers in Belgium
Slovenian expatriate sportspeople in Belgium
Expatriate footballers in Ukraine
Slovenian expatriate sportspeople in Ukraine